This article lists the most important national environmental laws by continent and country.

Africa

Egypt 
 Egyptian Law 102 of 1983, for Nature Protectorates
 Environmental Protection Law 4/1994 amended by Law 9/2009(Egypt)
 Law 48/1982
Concerning the Protection of Nile River and Water Channels
 Law 124/83
Concerning Fishing, Aquatic Life Organization of Fisheries
 Law 93/1962
Concerning Discharge of Liquid Wastes
 Law 27/1978
Concerning Organizing General Water Resources for Drinking and Human Use

Kenya 
 Biosafety Act 2009
 Environmental (Impact Assessment and Audit) Regulations, 2003
 Environmental Management and Co-ordination (Conservation of Biological Diversity and Resources, Access to Genetic Resources and Benefit Sharing) Regulations, 2006
 Environmental Management and Co-ordination (Controlled Substances) Regulations 2007
 Environmental Management and Co-ordination (Noise and Excessive Vibration Pollution) (Control) Regulations 2009
 Environmental Management and Co-ordination (Waste Management) Regulations 2006
 Environmental Management and Co-ordination (Water Quality) Regulations 2006
 Environmental Management and Co-ordination (Wetlands, Riverbanks, Lake Shores and Sea Shore Management) Regulations 2009
 Environmental Management and Co-ordination Act 1999 / no 8
 Environmental (Prevention Of Pollution In Coastal Zone And Other Segments Of The Environment) Regulation, 2003
 Fisheries Act (Chapter 378)
 Forests Act (Chapter 385)
 The Forests Act, 2005
 Kenya Tourist Development Authority (Chapter 382)
 Kenya's Environment Management and Coordination Act 1999
 Noise Regulations
 Timber Act (Chapter 386)
 Tourist Industry Licensing Act (Chapter 381)
 Water Act 2002
 Water Act 2002 / no 8
 Wildlife (Conservation and Management) Act (Chapter 376)

South Africa

Asia

China 
 Air Pollution Control Act (China)
 Animal Epidemic Prevention Law 1997
 Basic Environment Act
 Drinking Water Management Act
 Environmental Impact Assessment Act
 Environmental Protection Law 1989
 Environmental Protection Law of the People's Republic of China (For Trial Implementation) 1979
 Fisheries Law 1986
 Fisheries Law (2004 Revision)
 Flood Control Law 1997
 Forestry Law 1985
 Forestry Law of the People's Republic of China (1998)
 Grassland Law 1985
 Law of the People's Republic of China on the Prevention and Control of Environmental Pollution by Solid Waste
 Law of the People's Republic of China on Prevention and Control of Pollution from Environmental Noise
 Law of the People's Republic of China on Prevention and Control of Water Pollution
 Law of the People's Republic of China on Water and Soil Conservation
 Law on Desert Prevention and Transformation 2001
 Law on Marine Environment Protection 1983
 Law on Mineral Resources 1986
 Law on the Prevention and Control of Atmospheric Pollution
 Law on Prevention and Control of Atmospheric Pollution 2000
 Law on the Prevention and Control of Environmental Noise Pollution 1997
 Law on the Prevention and Control of Solid Wastes Pollution
 Law on Prevention and Control of Water Pollution 1996
 Law on Promoting Clean Production 2002
 Law on Protecting Against and Mitigating Earthquake Disasters
 Law on the Protection of Cultural Relics
 Law on the Protection of Wildlife 1989
 Law on the Protection of Wildlife (2004 Revision)
 Law on Water and Soil Conservation
 Marine Environmental Protection Law of the People's Republic of China (1983)
 Marine Pollution Control Act
 Public Nuisance Dispute Mediation Act
 Soil and Groundwater Pollution Remediation Act
 Water Law 1988
 Water Law 2002 (the modified edition)
 Water Pollution Control Act (China)
 Wildlife Protection Law

India 
 Water (Prevention and Control of Pollution) Act, 1974
 The Water (Prevention and Control of Pollution) cess act, 1977
 Air (Prevention and Control of Pollution) Act, 1981
 Biological Diversity Act, 2002
 Environment (Protection) Act, 1986
 Forest Conservation Act, 1980
 Hazardous Waste Handling and Management Rules, 1989
 Indian Forest Act, 1927
 The National Environment Tribunal Act, 1995
 National Green Tribunal Act, 2010
 Noise Pollution rule, 2000
 Protection of Plant Varieties and Farmers' Rights Act of 2001
 Public Liability Insurance Act, 1991
 The Scheduled Tribes and Other Traditional Forest Dwellers (Recognition of Forest Rights) Act, 2006
 Water (Prevention and Control of Pollution), 1974
 Wild Life (Protection) Amendment Act, 2002
 Wildlife Protection Act of 1972

Japan 
 Air Pollution Control Law
 Basic Environment Law
 Environmental Impact Assessment law
 Fisheries Law No 267 of 1949
 Fundamental Law for Establishing a Sound Material-Cycle Society
 Invasive Alien Species Act (Law No. 78, June 2, 2004)
 Law concerning the Conservation and Sustainable Use of Biological Diversity through Regulation on the Use of Living Modified Organisms
 Law Concerning the Promotion of Business Activities with Environmental Consideration by Specified Corporations, etc., by Facilitating Access to Environmental Information, and Other Measures
 Law Concerning the Promotion of the Measures to Cope with Global Warming
 Law Concerning the Protection of the Ozone Layer Through the Control of Specified Substances and Other Measures (May 1988)
 Law Concerning the Promotion of Procurement of Eco-Friendly Goods and Services by the State and Other Entities
 Law concerning the Rational Use of Energy
 Law concerning the Recovery and Destruction of Fluorocarbons (Fluorocarbons Recovery and Destruction Law) (June 2001)
 Law Concerning Reporting etc. of Releases to the Environment of Specific Chemical Substances and Promoting Improvements in Their Management
 Law Concerning Special Measures against Dioxins
 Law for the Control of Export, Import and Others of Specified Hazardous Wastes and Other Wastes
 Law for Enhancing Motivation on Environmental Conservation and Promoting of Environmental Education
 Law for the Promotion of Nature Restoration
 Law on Special Measures concerning Removal of Environmental Problems Caused by Specified Industrial Wastes
 Law relating to Protection of the Environment in Antarctica
 Noise Regulation Law
 NOx Law (Japan)
 Offensive Odor Control Law
 Studded Tires Regulation Law
 Vibration Regulation Law
 Waste Management and Public Cleansing Law
 Water Pollution Control Law
 Wildlife Protection and Hunting Law

Kyrgyzstan 
 Law on Animal World, 1999
 Law on Biosphere Areas in Kyrgyz Republic, 1999
 Law on Environment Protection, 1999
 Law on Environmental Expertise, 1999
 Law on General Technical Regulations ensuring Environmental Safety in Kyrgyz Republic, 2009
 Law on Protection and Use of Flora, 2001
 Law on Protection of Atmospheric Air, 1999
 Law on Protection of Ozone Layer, 2006
 Law on Radiation Safety of Population of Kyrgyz Republic, 1999
 Law on Renewable Energy Sources, 2008
 Law on Specially Protected Natural Territories, 2011
 Law on Sustainable Development of Environmental and Economic System Yssyk-Kul, 2004
 Law on Tailing Ponds and Mine Wastes, 2001
 Law on Waste of Production and Use, 2001
 Law on Water, 1994

Pakistan
 Pakistan Environmental Protection Act 1997
 Sindh Environmental Protection Act 2014

Philippines 

 Philippine Environmental Impact Statement System  
 Fisheries Act of 1932
 Philippine Environment Code
 Revised Forestry Code of the Philippines
 Water Code of the Philippines
 Pollution Control Law (Presidential Decree 1181; 1977)
 Philippine Environmental Impact Statement System (Presidential Decree 1586; 1978)
 Food Security Act of 1985
 Toxic Substances and Hazardous and Nuclear Waste Control Act of 1990
 Philippine Mining Act of 1995
 Animal Welfare Act of 1998
 Philippine Fisheries Code of 1998
 Clean Air Act of 1999
 Philippine Ecological Waste and Solid Management Act of 2000
 Wildlife Resources Conservation and Protection Act of 2001
 Chain Saw Act of 2002
 Philippine Plant Variety Protection Act of 2002
 Clean Water Act of 2004
 Environmental Awareness and Education Act of 2008
 Climate Change Act of 2009

Singapore
 Environmental Protection and Management Act (Cap 94A)
 Hazardous Waste (Control of Export, Import and Transit) Act (Cap. 122A)
 Parks and Trees Act (Cap. 216) and its associated regulations, the Parks and Trees Regulations (Cap. 216 Section 63) aimed at regulating conduct within parks and nature reserves.
 Wildlife Act (Cap. 351) aimed at protecting named species of plant, animal and fungi in Singapore
 Endangered Species (Import and Export) Act (Cap. 92A)  aimed at preventing the trade of wildlife protected under Convention on International Trade in Endangered Species (CITES)
 Carbon Pricing Act (No. 23 of 2018) aimed at regulating and limiting the carbon footprint of corporate bodies in Singapore.
 Resource Sustainability Act (No. 29 of 2019) aimed at conserving existing resources and materials.

Sri Lanka(Contribution by Dhanvin Nandakumaran of Gateway College Colombo, Sri Lanka)
 National Environmental Act 1980
 First Forest Policy 1929
 Fauna and Flora Protection Ordinance 1937

Europe

Austria 
 Animal Protection Act
 Environmental Impact Assessment Act 2000
 Federal Act dated 27th November 1984 - for comprehensive protection of the environment
 Federal Act No. 33/1998 on Trade of Wild Flora and Fauna
 Federal Law amending the Species Trade Act
 Forstgesetz 1975
 Lebensmittelsicherheits und Verbraucherschutzgesetz (LMSVG) 2006
 Umweltinformationsgesetzes (UIG)

Belgium 
 Loi du 20 janvier 1999 sur la protection du milieu marin dans les espaces marins sous juridiction de la Belgique
 Loi du 22 avril 1999 sur la zone économique exclusive de la Belgique dans la mer du Nord
 Wet van 20 januari 1999 tot bescherming van het mariene milieu in de zeegebieden onder de rechtsbevoegdheid van België
 Wet van 22 april 1999 betreffende de exclusieve economische zone van België in de Noordzee

Bulgaria 
 Agricultural Producers' Protection Act
 Amendments to the Law on protection of the environment
 Biological Diversity Act, 2002
 Environmental Protection Act 2002
 Forestry Act
 Law for Hunting and Protection of the Game
 Law of Preservation of Environment
 Law of the Purity of Atmospheric Air
 Law on obligations to the international reimbursement of damages from oil pollution fund
 Law on Protection against Harmful Impact of Chemical Substances and Preparations
 Law on Tourism
 Law on Waste Management 2003 (State Gazette No 86/2003)
 Medicinal Plants Act 2000 (State Gazette No 29/2000)
 Nature Protection Act
 Protected Areas Act 1998 (State Gazette No 133/1998)
 Protection of Waters and Soil against Pollution Act
 Regulation on the terms and conditions for carrying out Environmental Impact Assessment (SG 25/18.03.2003)
 Regulations for implementation of the Law for the forests
 Water Act 1999 (State Gazette No. 67/27.1999)

Cyprus 
 Air Quality Law 188(I)/2002
 Air Quality Law (Air Pollution by Ozone) Regulations P.I. 530/2002
 Air Quality Law (Amendment) Law 53(I)/2004
 Air Quality Law (Annual Emission Ceilings for Certain Atmospheric Pollutants) Regulations P.I. 193/2004
 Air Quality Law (Limit Values for Benzene and Carbon Monoxide in Ambient Air) Regulations P.I. 516/2002
 Air Quality (Ozone in Ambient Air) Regulations P.I. 194/2004
 Control of Atmospheric Pollution (Control of Volatile Organic Compounds Emissions Resulting from the Storage of Petrol and its Distribution from Terminals to Service Stations) Regulations P.I. 76/2003
 Control of Atmospheric Pollution (Incineration of Hazardous Wastes) Regulations P.I. 638/2002
 Control of Atmospheric Pollution (Incineration of Waste Oils) Regulations P.I. 529/2002
 Control of Atmospheric Pollution (Incineration of Wastes) Regulations P.I. 284/2003
 Control of Atmospheric Pollution Law 187(I)/2002
 Control of Atmospheric Pollution (Limitation and Control of Atmospheric Pollution caused by Waste from Titanium Dioxide Industry) Regulations P.I. 527/2002
 Control of Atmospheric Pollution (Limitation of Emissions of Certain Pollutants into Air from Large Combustion Plants) Regulations P.I. 195/2004
 Control of Atmospheric Pollution (Limitation of Volatile Organic Compounds due to the Use of Organic Solvents in Certain Activities and Installations) Regulations P.I. 73/2003
 Control of Atmospheric Pollution (Non Licensable Installations) Regulations P.I. 170/2004
 Control of Atmospheric Pollution (Prevention and Reduction of Atmospheric Pollution by Asbestos) Regulations P.I. 528/2002
 Control of Atmospheric Pollution (Prevention of Air Pollution from Existing Municipal Incineration Plants) Regulations P.I. 75/2003
 Control of Atmospheric Pollution (Procedures for the Surveillance and Monitoring of Environments concerned by Waste from Titanium Dioxide Industry) Regulations P.I. 545/2002
 Forest Law 1967
 Integrated Pollution Prevention and Control Law 56(I)/2003
 Law 77(I)/2010 for the Quality of Atmospheric Air
 Protection from Ionising Radiation Law 115(I)/2002
 Regulation 327/2010 regarding the Quality of Atmospheric Air

Czech Republic 
 Act 1991 - 2 Collective Bargaining Act
 Act 1992 - 1 on Wages, Remuneration for Stand-Bye, and Average Earnings
 Act 1992 - 114 on the protection of nature and Landscape
 Act 1995 - 289 Forest Act
 Act 2001 - 100 on environmental impact assessment
 Act 2001 - 185 on Waste
 Act 2001 - 254 Water Act
 Act 2002 - 521 on integrated pollution prevention and control (amendment)
 Act 2004 - 99 on Fishery
 Act 2005 - 7 amending Act No. 185/2001 - Coll. on waste and on amendment to some other laws
 Decree 2004 – 382 - on the protection of farm animals at the time of slaughter, killing or other ways of putting to death
 Decree 2005 – 424 - amending Decree No 382/2004 Coll. on the protection of farm animals at the time of slaughter, killing or other ways of putting to death
 Decree 2006 – 346 - on laying down more detailed conditions of keeping and training of animals
 Decree 2008 – 411 - specifying animal species requiring special care
 Decree 2009 – 3 - on professional competence for the performance of supervision in the field of protection of animals against cruelty
 Decree 2009 – 4 - on the protection of animals during transport
 Decree 2009 – 5 - on the protection of animals at a public performance and in breeding
 Regulation 2003 on the Waste Management Plan of the Czech Republic

Denmark 
 Act on Access to Information on the Environment No. 292 of April 27, 1994
 Act on Environment and Genetic Engineering No. 356 of June 6, 1991
 Act on the Protection of the Marine Environment No. 476 of June 30, 1993
 Act on the Protection of the Marine Environment, the Safety of ships Act, and Merchant Shipping Act (Exclusive Economic Zones Act) No. 394 of May 22, 1996
 Act on Waste Deposits No. 420 of June 13, 1990
 Consolidated Act from the Ministry of the Environment on Watercourses No. 404 of May 19, 1992
 Consolidated Act on Chemical Substances and Products No. 21 of January 16, 1996
 Consolidated Act on Taxes on Waste and Raw Materials No. 570 of August 3, 1998
 Consolidated Act on Water Supply
 Consolidated Environment And Genetic Engineering Act No. 981 Of December 2002
 Consolidated Environmental Protection Act No. 698 of September 22, 1998
 Contaminated Soil Act No. 370 of June 2, 1999
 Danish Forest Act 1989 Act no 383

Estonia 
 Deliberate Release into the Environment of Genetically Modified Organisms Act
 Earth's Crust Act
 Environmental Impact Assessment and Environmental Management System Act 2005
 Environmental Monitoring Act 1999 (amended until 2005)
 Environmental Supervision Act
 Forest Act 2007
 Hunting Act (Estonia)
 Law on Hunting Management
 Nature Conservation Act (Estonia)
 Tourism Act
 Tourism Law 2000
 Water Act

Finland 
 Act on Compensation for Environmental Damage 1994
 Act on Environmental Permit Authorities 2000
 Act on the Financing of Sustainable Forestry
 Act on Implementation of the Legislation on Environmental Protection
 Act on Jointly Owned Forests
 Act on Metsähallitus
 Act on Trade in Forest Reproductive Material
 Act on Water Resources Management 2004
 Act on Water Services (119/2001)
 Animal Welfare Act (Finland)
 Animal Welfare Decree
 Decree on the Financing of Sustainable Forestry
 Environmental Damage Insurance Act
 Environmental Protection Act (Finland)
 Environmental Protection Decree
 Forest Act 1996
 Forest Decree
 Forest Management Association Act
 Forest Management Association Decree
 Government Decree on the Assessment of Soil Contamination and Remediation Needs
 Government Decree on Substances Dangerous and Harmful to the Aquatic Environment 2006
 Government Decree on Urban Waste Water Treatment 2006
 Hunting Act 1993
 Nature Conservation Act (1096/1996)
 Nature Conservation Decree 1997
 Waste Act (1072/1993)
 Waste Decree 1993
 Waste Oil Charge Act (894/1986)

France 
 Code de l'environnement
 Code forestier

Germany 
 Law on Conservation and Environmental Care (Gesetz über Naturschutz und Landschaftspflege - Bundesnaturschutzgesetz - BNatSchG)
 Law on Protection for Environmental Harms due to Air Pollution, Noise, etc. (Gesetz zum Schutz vor schädlichen Umwelteinwirkungen durch Luftverunreinigungen, Geräusche, Erschütterungen und ähnliche Vorgänge - Bundes-Immissionsschutzgesetz - BImSchG)
 Regulation on Drinking Water Quality (Trinkwasserverordnung - TrinkwV)
 Regulation on Soil Protection (Bundesbodenschutzgesetz - BBSchG)
 Regulation on Waste Management (Kreislaufwirtschaftsgesetz - KrwG)
 Regulation on Water Usage (Wasserhaushaltsgesetz - WHG)

Greece 
 Law 2939 Waste Law

Iceland
 Act on Protective Measures Against Avalanches and Landslides, 1997
 Act on Radiation Protection, 2002
 Emissions of Greenhouse Gases Act No. 65, 2007
 Environmental Impact Assessment Act (Iceland) No. 106, 25 May 2000
 Fisheries Management Act No. 38, 15 May 1990
 Nature Conservation Act

Ireland 
 Air Pollution Act 1987
 Chemicals Act 2008
 Dumping at Sea (Amendment) Act 2004
 Fisheries (Amendment) Act 2003
 Foreshore and Dumping at Sea (Amendment) Act 2009
 Forestry Act 1988
 Forestry (Amendment) Act 2009
 Foyle and Carlingford Fisheries Act 2007
 Litter Pollution Act 1997
 No. 27/2003: Protection of the Environment Act 2003
 Oil Pollution of the Sea (Civil Liability and Compensation) (Amendment) Act 2003
 Protection of the Environment Act 2003
 Sea Pollution (Amendment) Act 1999
 Sea Pollution (Hazardous Substances)(Compensation) Act 2005
 Sea Pollution (Miscellaneous Provisions) Act 2006
 Waste Management (Amendment) Act 2001
 Water Services Act 2007
 Wildlife Act 1976
 Wildlife (Amendment) Act 2000
 Climate Action and Low Carbon Development 2015

Italy 
 Decreto Presidente 1997 - 357 Regolamento recante attuazione della direttiva 92/43/CEE relativa alla conservazione degli habitat
 Law 1993 - 157 provisions for the protection of wildlife and restrictions on hunting
 Legge 2002 - 179 Disposizioni in materia ambientale
 Decreto Lgislativo Governo 3 aprile 2006, n. 152, Norme in materia ambientale.

Latvia 
 Animal Protection Law
 Chemical Substances and Chemical Products Law
 Environmental Protection Law (Latvia)
 Fishery Law
 Forestry Law
 Hunting Law (2003)
 Law on Chemical Substances and Chemical Products
 Law on the Conservation of Species and Biotopes
 Law on End-of Life Vehicles Management
 Law on Environmental Impact Assessment (Latvia) (amended until 2005)
 Law on Environmental Protection (Latvia)
 Law on Pollution
 Law on Specially Protected Nature Territories (1993)
 Law on Subterranean Depths
 Packaging Law (9 January 2002)
 Protection Zone Law (5 February 1997)
 Regulation No. 118 - adopted on 12 March 2002; "Regulations regarding the Quality of Surface Waters and Groundwaters"
 Regulation No. 280 - adopted 24 April 2007; "General Procedures for the Issue of Licences for the Use of Subterranean Depths and Authorisations for the Extraction of Widespread Mineral Resources, and for the Use of Geological Information"
 Regulation No. 34 - "Regulations regarding Discharge of Polluting Substances into Water" (22 January 2002)
 Regulation No. 475 - "Procedures regarding the Cleaning and Deepening of Surface Water Bodies and Port Basins"; 13 June 2006
 Regulation No. 595 - adopted 18 July 2006 "Regulations regarding the Protection of the Environment during the Works of Exploration and Extraction of Hydrocarbons in the Sea"
 Regulation No. 736 - "Regulations Regarding a Permit for the Use of Water Resources"; 23 December 2003
 Regulation No. 779 - adopted 19 September 2006; "Procedures for the Extraction of Mineral Resources"
 Regulation No. 857 - "Regulations regarding Procedures for Ascertaining of Groundwater Resources and Criteria of Quality" 19 October 2004
 Regulations no 184 Requirements for Activities with Biocidal Products
 Regulations no 340 on Procedures for Import, Notification and Risk Assessment of New Chemical Substances (6 August 2002)
 Regulations on electrical and electronic equipment waste management (9 November 2004)
 Regulations Regarding the Limitation of Emissions of Volatile Organic Compounds from Certain Products
 Regulations Regarding Protection of Water and Soil from Pollution with Nitrates Caused by Agricultural Sources
 Regulations Regarding Restrictions and Prohibitions on Use and Marketing of Dangerous Chemical Substances and Dangerous Chemical Products
 Regulations Regarding Restrictions of the Use of Chemicals in Electric and Electronic Equipment
 Tourism Law
 Waste Management Law

Lithuania 
 Environmental Protection Law (Lithuania)
 Forestry Law (Lithuania)
 Law on the Department Of Environmental Protection
 Law on Drinking Water Supply and Waste Water Management
 Law on Environmental Protection (Lithuania)
 Law on Financial Instruments for Climate Change management
 Law on Fisheries
 Law on the Management of Packaging and Packaging Waste
 Law on the Management of Radioactive Waste
 Law on Water
 The Underground Law

Luxembourg 
 Code de l'Environnement
 Loi du 10 août 1993 relative aux parcs naturels
 Loi du 10 juin 1999 relative aux établissements classés
 Loi du 11 mars 2008 ayant pour objet d’autoriser le Gouvernement à subventionner l’exécution d’unhuitième palanquin quen nal del infrastructure touristique
 Loi du 14 avril 1992 portant réglementation de la mise sur le marché de substances qui appauvrissent la
 Loi du 19 décembre 2008 relative à l'eau
 Loi du 19 janvier 2004 concernant la protection de la nature et des ressources naturelles
 Loi du 19 novembre 2003 modifiant la loi du 10 juin 1999 relative aux établissements classés
 Loi du 25 avril 1970 modifiant et complétant la loi du 17 juillet 1960 portant institution d ´un statut de l ´hôtellerie
 Loi du 25 juin 2004, la loi relative à la coordination de la politique nationale de développement durable a été adoptée
 Loi du 28 mai 2004 portant création d’une Administration de la gestion de l’eau
 Loi du 6 juillet 1999 portant création d’un réseau national de pistes cyclables
 Loi modifiée du 21 juin 1976 relative à la lutte contre le bruit
 Règlement grand-ducal du 7 mars 2003 concernant l’évaluation des incidences de certains projets publics et privés sur l’environnement
 Règlement grand-ducal du 9 janvier 2009 concernant la protection intégrale et partielle de certaines espèces animales de la faune sauvage

Malta 
 Clean Air Act (Malta)
 Filfla Nature Reserve Act
 Integrated Pollution Prevention & Control Regulations
 L.N. 13/2006 Control and Security of High-Activity Radioactive and Orphan
 L.N. 44/03 Nuclear Safety and Radiation Protection Regulations, 2003
 Litter Act
 Malta's International Obligations regarding Environmental Matters
 Management of Bathing Water Quality Regulations, 2008
 Prevention and Remedying of Environmental Damage Regulations, 2008
 Quality of Water Intended for Human Consumption Regulations, 2009
 Strategic Environmental Assessment Regulations, 2005
 Waste Management (Management of Waste from Extractive Industries and Backfilling) Regulations, 2009
 Waste Management (Waste Oils) Regulations
 Water Services Corporation Act
 Water Supply (Amendment) Regulations, 2008

Netherlands 
 Boswet
 Cadmium Decree 1999 - rules for the manufacture and sale of products containing cadmium
 Environment Protection Act
 Environmental Management Act 2004
 Experiments on Animals Act 1997
 Flora en faunawet
 Groundwater Act
 Invoeringswet Waterwet
 Marine Pollution Act
 Natuurbeschermingswet 1998
 Ontgrondingenwet
 Soil Protection Act
 Waterleidingbesluit
 Waterleidingwet
 Waterwet 2008
 Wet beheer rijkswaterstaatswerken
 Wet Bodembescherming
 Wet Geluidhinder
 Wet milieubeheer
 Wet verontreiniging van oppervlaktewateren

Norway
 Act 13 March 1981 no 6 - relating to protection against pollution and relating to waste. Last amended by Act 10 December 1999 no 83
 Act on Radiation Protection and Use of Radiation 2000
 Act Relating to Biobanks 2003
 Animal Welfare Act 1974
 Cultural Heritage Act 1978
 Environmental Information Act 2003
 Finnmark Act (2005)
 Forestry Act 2005
 Gene Technology Act 1993
 Greenhouse Gas Emission Trading Act 2004
 Nature Conservation Act 1970
 Pollution Control Act (Norway)
 Pollution Control Act of 13 March 1981 No.6
 Regulations Relating to Pollution Control (pollution regulations)
 Regulations Relating to Restrictions on the Use of Chemicals and Other Products Hazardous to Health and the Environment (product regulations)
 Svalbard Environmental Protection Act 2001
 Waste Regulations (Norway)
 Water Resources Act 2000
 Watercourse Regulation Act 1917
 Wildlife Act 1981

Poland 
 Act 1991 on Inspection for Environmental Protection
 Act 1997 Poland Animal Protection Act
 Act 2000 on Access to Information on the Environment and Its Protection and on Environmental Impact Assessments
 Act 2001 on Waste

Portugal 
 Decreto-Lei 151B - de 31 de outubro de 2013 - aprova o regime jurídico da Avaliação de Impacte Ambiental (AIA)dos projetos públicos e privados suscetíveis de produzirem efeitos significativos no ambient.
 Decreto-Lei 1998 - 236 Lei da qualidade da agua
 Decreto-Lei 2007 - 306 Lei estabelece o regime da qualidade da água destinada ao consumo humano
 Lei 1959 - 2097 Lei de Bases do Fomento Piscícola nas Águas Interiores
 Lei 1987 - 11 Lei de Bases do Ambiente
 Lei 2005 - 58 Lei de Agua

Romania
 Law 1995-137 Environmental Protection Law
 Law 1996-107 Water Law
 Law 1996-26 Forest Code
 Law 2000-182 Regarding the Protection of the Movable National Heritage
 Law 2001-422 Protection of Historical Monuments
 Law 2006-407 Law on Hunting
 Law 2008-46 Forestry Code

Russia
 Forest Code of the Russian Federation
 Water Code of the Russian Federation

Slovakia 
 Act 287 / 1994 - on the Preservation of Nature and Landscape
 Act No. 163/2001 - Coll. on Chemical Substances and Chemical Preparations
 Act No. 238/1991 - on the Collection of Waste
 Regulation 1993 - on the specification of areas requiring special protection of the atmosphere and on the operation of smog warning and control systems

Slovenia 
 Act on protection against ionising radiation and nuclear safety
 Biocidal Products Act
 Chemicals Act
 Cosmetic Products Act
 Decree Amending the Decree on the Method, Subject and Conditions for the Provision of the Public Utility Service of Management of Abattoir Waste and Infectious Material of Animal Origin
 Decree on Amendments and Additions to the Decree on Noise in the Natural and Living Environment
 Decree on Amendments and Supplements to the Decree on Charges for the Loading of the Atmosphere with Carbon Dioxide Emissions
 Decree on changes and additions to the decree on the tax for the pollution of the air with emissions of carbon dioxide
 Decree on the Emission of Substances into the Atmosphere from Hazardous Waste Incineration Plants
 Decree on the emission of substances into the atmosphere from lacquering plants
 Decree on the Emission of Substances into the Atmosphere from Municipal Waste Incineration Plants
 Decree on the emission of substances into the atmosphere from plants for the production and processing of wood products
 Decree on the emission of substances into the atmosphere from plants for the production of lead and its alloys from secondary raw materials
 Decree on Emission of Volatile Organic Compounds into the Air from the Storage of Petrol and From its Distribution from Terminals to Service Stations
 Decree on the Export, Import and Transit of Wastes
 Decree on the Input of Dangerous Substances and Plant Nutrients into the Soil
 Decree on the Limit, Warning and Critical Concentration Values of Dangerous Substances in Soil
 Decree on the manner, subject and conditions for performing the commercial public service of managing radioactive waste
 Decree on Noise in the Natural and Living Environment
 Decree on Noise Owing to Road and Railway Traffic
 Decree on the quality of liquid fuels with regard to their sulphur, lead and benzene content
 Decree on the quantity of waste from the production of titanium dioxide discharged into water and on the emission of substances into the air from the production of titanium dioxide
 Decree on the tax for the pollution of the atmosphere with emissions of carbon dioxide
 Environment Protection Act (Slovenia)
 Forest Act
 Forest reproductive materials act
 Management of Genetically modified organisms Act
 Nature Conservation Act (Slovenia)
 Regulations on Changes and Additions to the Regulations on the Management of Wastes which Contain Toxic Substances
 Regulations on Initial Measurement of Noise and Operational Monitoring for Sources of Noise and on Conditions for their Execution
 Regulations on Initial Measurements and Operational Monitoring for Sources of Electromagnetic Radiation and on Conditions for Their Execution
 Rules on Amendments and Supplements to the Rules on Initial Measurements and Operational Monitoring of the Emission of Substances into the Atmosphere from Stationary Sources of Pollution, and on the Conditions for their Implementation
 Rules on amendments and supplements to the rules on waste management
 Rules on Authorizations for Biocidal Products Based on Mutual Recognition within the European Union
 Rules on the Disposal of Polychlorinated Biphenyls and Polychlorinated Terphenys
 Rules on the form for the notification of suppliers of cosmetic products and the procedure or notifying new cosmetic products prior to their first placing on the market
 Rules on the Handling of Packaging and Packaging Waste
 Rules on the labelling of cosmetic products
 Rules on landfill waste tipping
 Rules on the management of waste from the production of titanium dioxide
 Rules on the Management of Waste Oils
 Rules on the monitoring of environmental pollution from the production of titanium dioxide
 Rules on Monitoring Seismicity in Regions with Large Dams
 Rules on the quality of liquid fuels
 Rules on the reporting of data on chemicals
 Rules on Waste Incineration
 Rules on Waste Management
 Waters Act

Spain 
 Ley 1989 - 4 de Conservación de los Espacios Naturales y de la flora y fauna silvestres (on the preservation of natural areas and wildlife)
 Ley 1995 - 38 sobre el Derecho de Acceso a la Información en materia de Medio Ambiente (on public access to environmental information)
 Ley 1995 - 5 de Protección de los animales (on the protection of animals)
 Ley 2000 - 5 de saneamiento y depuración de aguas residuales de La Rioja (on water treatment for the autonomous region of La Rioja, provincial law)
 Ley 2003 - 37 del Ruido (on noise)
 Ley 2005 - 1 por la que se regula el régimen del comercio de derechos de emisión de gases de efecto invernadero (on greenhouse gas emissions trading)
 Ley 2006 - 27 por la que se regulan los derechos de acceso a la información, de participación pública y de acceso a la justicia en materia de medio ambiente (on public access to information, public participation and justice related to environmental matters)
 Ley 2007 - 26 de Responsabilidad Medioambiental (on environmental liability)
 Ley 2007 - 32 para el cuidado de los animales, en su explotación, transporte, experimentación y sacrificio (on animal welfare regarding their breeding, transportation, experimentation and slaughter)
 Ley 2007 - 34 de calidad del aire y protección de la atmósfera (on air quality and the protection of the atmosphere)
 Ley 2010 - 3 por la que se aprueban medidas urgentes para paliar los daños producidos por los incendios forestales y otras catástrofes naturales ocurridos en varias Comunidades Autónomas (approves urgent actions to mitigate impacts due to forest fires and other natural disasters in different Autonomous Regions)
 Ley 2013 - 21 de Evaluación Ambiental (on Environmental Impact Assessment)
 Ley Organica 2007 - 16 complementaria de la Ley para el desarrollo sostenible del medio rural (complements the Law on sustainable development of rural areas)
 Real Decreto Legislativo 2008 - 2 por el que se aprueba el texto refundido de la ley de suelo (consolidated text of the Soil Law)

Sweden 
 Animal Welfare Act (Sweden)
 Animal Welfare Ordinance
 Fishery Conservation Areas Act (SFS 1981:533)
 Forest Act 2004
 Heritage Conservation Act (Sweden) (1988:950)
 Heritage Conservation Ordinance (1988:1188)
 Ordinance concerning Environmentally Hazardous Activities and the Protection of Public Health (1998:899)
 Ordinance on Environmental Quality Standards on Ambient Air (2001:527)
 Ordinance on Land and Water Management (1998:896)
 Plant Protection Ordinance (2006:1010)
 Public Water Areas (Boundaries) Act (SFS 1950:595)
 Radiation Protection Act (1988:220)
 Swedish Environmental Code (1998:808)

Switzerland
 Bundesgesetz vom 1. Juli 1966 über den Natur- und Heimatschutz (NHG)
 Bundesgesetz vom 20. Juni 1986 über die Jagd und den Schutz wildlebender Säugetiere und Vögel (Jagdgesetz, JSG)
 Bundesgesetz vom 22. Dezember 1916 über die Nutzbarmachung der Wasserkräfte (Wasserrechtsgesetz, WRG)
 Bundesgesetz vom 22. Juni 1877 über die Wasserbaupolizei
 Bundesgesetz vom 24. Januar 1991 über den Schutz der Gewässer (Gewässerschutzgesetz, GSchG)
 Bundesgesetz vom 4. Oktober 1991 über den Wald (Waldgesetz, WaG)
 Bundesgesetz über den Natur- und Heimatschutz
 Chemicals Ordinance (ChemO)
 Chemikaliengebührenverordnung (ChemGebV)
 Chemikalienverordnung (ChemV)
 -Gesetz
 Environmental Protection Act (Switzerland) (EPA)
 Federal Act of 7 October 1983 on the Protection of the Environment (Environmental Protection Act, EPA)
 Federal Act on the Protection of Waters (GSchG)
 Federal Act on Railways Noise Abatement
 Federal Law on the reduction of  emissions
 Federal Law relating to Non-human Gene Technology
 Federal Law relating to the Protection of the Environment
 Gentechnikgesetz (GTG)
 Gewässerschutzgesetz (GSchG)
 Gewässerschutzverordnung (GSchV)
 Hydraulic Engineering Act
 Jagdgesetz (JSG)
 Jagdverordnung (JSV)
 Luftreinhalte-Verordnung (LRV)
 Lärmschutz-Verordnung (LSV)
 Nationalparkgesetz
 Natur- und Heimatschutzgesetz (NHG)
 Noise Abatement Ordinance
 Ordinance of 7 November 2007 on Parks of National Importance (Parks Ordinance, ParkO)
 Ordinance on Air Pollution
 Ordinance on Beverage Containers (VGV)
 Ordinance on Environmental Impact Assessment
 Ordinance on Hydraulic Engineering (WBV)
 Ordinance on Plant Protection Products (PSMV)
 Ordinance on Railways Noise Abatement
 Ordinance relating to Impacts on the Soil (VBBo)
 Ordinance relating to Protection from Non-Ionizing Radiation (NISV)
 Ordonnance du 7 décembre 1998 concernant la sécurité des ouvrages d’accumulation (Ordonnance sur les ouvrages d’accumulation, OSOA)
 Ordonnance sur la chasse (OChP)
 Ordonnance sur la protection contre le bruit (OPB)
 Ordonnance sur la protection contre le rayonnement non ionisant (ORNI)
 Ordonnance sur la protection de la nature et du paysage (OPN)
 Ordonnance sur la protection de l’air (OPair)
 Ordonnance sur la protection des eaux (OEaux)
 Ordonnance sur la taxe sur le  (Ordonnance sur le )
 Ordonnance sur l’aménagement des cours d’eau (OACE)
 Ordonnance sur les atteintes portées aux sols (OSol)
 Ordonnance sur les emballages pour boissons (OEB)
 Ordonnance sur les forêts (OFo)
 Ordonnance sur les produits chimiques (OChim)
 Pflanzenschutzmittelverordnung (PSMV)
 Technical Ordinance on Waste (TVA)
 Umweltschutzgesetz (USG)
 Verordnung vom 12. Februar 1918 über die Berechnung des Wasserzinses (Wasserzinsverordnung, WZV)
 Verordnung vom 2. Februar 2000 über die Nutzbarmachung der Wasserkräfte (Wasserrechtsverordnung, WRV)
 Verordnung vom 25. Oktober 1995 über die Abgeltung von Einbussen bei der Wasserkraftnutzung (VAEW)
 Verordnung über Belastungen des Bodens (VBBo)
 Verordnung über Getränkeverpackungen (VGV)
 Verordnung über den Natur- und Heimatschutz (NHV)
 Verordnung über den Schutz vor nichtionisierender Strahlung (NISV)
 Verordnung über die -Abgabe (-Verordnung)
 Waldgesetz (WaG)
 Waldverordnung (WaV)
 Wasserbaugesetz (WBG)
 Wasserbauverordnung (WBV)
 Water Protection Ordinance (GSchV)

Turkey
 Law 1946-4922 on the Protection of Life and Property at Sea
 Law 1956-6831 Forest Law
 Law 1964-12 on Water Pollution by Oil
 Law 1982-2634 for the Encouragement of Tourism
 Law 1983-2872 Environment Law

United Kingdom 

 Alkali Act 1863
 Clean Air Act 1956
 Clean Air Act 1968
 Clean Air Act 1993
 Clean Neighbourhoods and Environment Act 2005
 Climate Change Act 2008
 Climate Change and Sustainable Energy Act 2006
 Energy Act 2010
 Environment Act 1995
 Environmental Protection Act 1990
 Flood and Water Management Act 2010
 Forestry Act 1991
 Ground Game Act 1880
 Hunting Act 2004
 Merchant Shipping (Pollution) Act 2006
 Natural Environment and Rural Communities Act 2006
 Planning Act 2008
 Pollution Prevention and Control Act 1999
 Waste Minimisation Act 1998
 Water Act 2003
 Weeds Act 1959

Northern Ireland 
 Game Preservation (Amendment) Act 2002
 Water and Sewerage Services (Amendment) Act 2010

Scotland 
 Climate Change (Scotland) Act 2009
 Marine (Scotland) Act 2010

North America

Canada 
 Arctic Waters Pollution Prevention Act
 Canada Fisheries Act
 Canada Forestry Act
 Canada Shipping Act
 Canada Water Act
 Canada Wildlife Act
 Canadian Environmental Assessment Act, 1992
 Canadian Environmental Protection Act, 1999 - main piece of Canadian environmental legislation, focusing on "respecting pollution prevention and the protection of the environment and human health in order to contribute to sustainable development."
 Department of the Environment Act
 Hazardous Products Act (Canada)
 Migratory Birds Convention Act
 National Parks Act (Canada)
 Natural Heritage Conservation Act (Canada)
 Navigable Waters Protection Act
 Pest Control Products Act (Canada)
 Rocky Mountains Park Act
 Species at Risk Act
 Transportation of Dangerous Goods Act (Canada), 1992

Alberta 
 Climate Change and Emissions Management Amendment Act
 Environmental Protection and Enhancement Act (Alberta)
 Fisheries Act (Alberta)
 Forest Act (Alberta)
 Water Act (Alberta)
 Wildlife Act (Alberta)

British Columbia 
 Environmental Management Act (British Columbia)
 Forest Act (British Columbia)
 Water Act (British Columbia)
 Water Protection Act (British Columbia)
 Wildlife Act (British Columbia)

Manitoba 
 East Side Traditional Lands Planning and Special Protected Areas Act (Manitoba)
 Ecological Reserves Act (Manitoba)
 Environment Act (Manitoba)
 Forest Act (Manitoba)
 Provincial Parks Act (Manitoba)
 Water Protection Act (Manitoba)
 Water Rights Act (Manitoba)
 Wildlife Act (Manitoba)

New Brunswick 

 Clean Water Act (New Brunswick)
 Heritage Conservation Act (New Brunswick)

Newfoundland 
 Environment Act (Newfoundland)
 Environmental Assessment Act (Newfoundland)
 Environmental Protection Act (Newfoundland)
 Forestry Act (Newfoundland)
 Water Resources Act (Newfoundland)

Northwest Territories 
 Environmental Protection Act (Northwest Territories)
 Forest Management Act (Northwest Territories)
 Forest Protection Act (Northwest Territories)
 Water Resources Agreements Act (Northwest Territories)

Northern Territories 
 Waters Act (Northern Territories)
 Wildlife Act (Northern Territories)

Nova Scotia 
 Environment Act (Nova Scotia)
 Environmental Goals and Sustainable Prosperity Act (Nova Scotia)
 Forests Act (Nova Scotia)
 Water Resources Protection Act (Nova Scotia)
 Wildlife Act (Nova Scotia)
 Special Places Protection Act (Nova Scotia)
 Wilderness Areas Protection Act (Nova Scotia)
 Crown Lands Act (Nova Scotia)
 Parks Development Act (Nova Scotia)
 Water Act (Nova Scotia)
 Beaches Act (Nova Scotia)
 Beaches and Foreshores Act (Nova Scotia)

Ontario 

 Clean Water Act 2005 (Ontario)
 Clean Water Act (Ontario)
 Environmental Assessment Act (Ontario)
 Environmental Bill of Rights
 Environmental Protection Act (Ontario)
 Forestry Act (Ontario)
 Green Energy Act (Ontario)
 Nutrient Management Act (Ontario)
 Ontario Water Resources Act
 Pesticides Act (Ontario)
 Safe Drinking Water Act
 Toxics Reduction Act (Ontario)
 Waste Management Act 1992 (Ontario)

Prince Edward Island 
 Environment Tax Act (Prince Edward Island)
 Environmental Protection Act (Prince Edward Island)
 Forest Management Act (Prince Edward Island)
 Water and Sewerage Act (Prince Edward Island)
 Wildlife Conservation Act (Prince Edward Island)

Quebec 
 Environment Quality Act (Quebec)
 Forest Act (Quebec)

Saskatchewan 
 Environmental Assessment Act (Saskatchewan)
 Fisheries Act (Saskatchewan)
 Wildlife Act (Saskatchewan)

Yukon 
 Environment Act (Yukon)
 Environmental Assessment Act (Yukon)
 Waters Act (Yukon)
 Wildlife Act (Yukon)

Mexico

 Ley Ambiental del Distrito Federal  - Environmental Law of the Federal District
 Ley de Agua del Estado de Sonora  - Water Act of the State of Sonora
 Ley de Aguas del Distrito Federal  - Water Law of the Federal District
 Ley de Aguas Nacionales  - National Water Law
 Ley de Bioseguridad de Organismos Genéticamente Modificados  - Law on Biosafety of Genetically Modified Organisms
 Ley de Pesca  - Fisheries Act
 Ley Federal de Turismo -  Federal Tourism Law
 Ley Federal del Mar  - Federal Law of the Sea
 Ley Forestal  - Forestry Law
 Ley General de Bienes Nacionales  - General Law of National Assets
 Ley General de Vida Silvestre  - General Wildlife Act
 Ley General del Equilibrio Ecológico y la Protección al Ambient  - General Law of Ecological Equilibrium and Protection Ambient

United States

South America

Bolivia 
 Law of the Rights of Mother Earth

Brazil 
 Lei Nº 6.938/81 - Lei da Política Nacional do Meio Ambiente, de 31 de agosto de 1981, que trata da Política Nacional do Meio Ambiente, seus fins e mecanismos de formulação e aplicação.
 Lei Nº 7.347/85 - Lei da Ação Civil Pública, de 24 de julho de 1985, que trata da ação civil pública de responsabilidade por danos causados ao meio ambiente, ao consumidor, a bens e direitos de valor artístico, estético, histórico e turístico.
 Lei Nº 9.605/98 - Lei de Crimes Ambientais, de 12 de fevereiro de 1998, que trata das sanções penais e administrativas derivadas de condutas e atividades lesivas ao meio ambiente.
LEI N° 5.197, DE 3 DE JANEIRO DE 1967

 http://www.planalto.gov.br/ccivil_03/leis/L5197.htm - Lei n. 5197/67. Dispõe sobre a proteção à fauna e dá outras providências.

Chile 
 Ley Nº 19.300 - Ley sobre bases generales del medio ambiente (Ley Nº 19300, 09 de Marzo de 1994)

Oceania

Australia 
 Biological Control Act 1984
 Clean Energy Act 2011 (repealed in 2014)
 Commonwealth Radioactive Waste Management Act 2005
 Environmental Protection Act 1994
 Environment Protection and Biodiversity Conservation Act 1999 - centerpiece environmental legislation in Australia
 Environment Protection (Sea Dumping) Act 1981
Great Barrier Reef Marine Park Act 1975
 Hazardous Waste (Regulation of Exports and Imports) Act 1989
 National Environment Protection Council Act 1994
National Greenhouse and Energy Reporting Act 2007
 Ozone Protection Act 1989
Product Stewardship Act 2011
 Water Act 2007
 Wildlife Protection (Regulation of Exports and Imports) Act 1982
 World Heritage Properties Conservation Act 1983

New South Wales 
 Environmental Planning and Assessment Act 1979
 Forestry Act 1916 No 55 (New South Wales)

Northern Territory 
 Darwin Waterfront Corporation Act 2006

Queensland 
 Forestry Act 1959 (Queensland)
 Nature Conservation Act 1992
 Nuclear Facilities Prohibition Act 2007 (Queensland)
 Water Act 2000 (Queensland)

South Australia 
 Environment Protection Act 1993
 Forestry Act 1950 (South Australia)
 Water Resources Act 1997 (South Australia)
 Wilderness Protection Act 1992 (South Australia)

Tasmania 
 Environmental Management and Pollution Control Act 1994 (Tasmania)
 Forestry Act 1920 (Tasmania)
 Living Marine Resources Management Act 1995 (Tasmania)
 Threatened Species Protection Act 1995
 Water Management Act 1999 (Tasmania)
 Wildlife Regulations 1999 (Tasmania)

Victoria 
 Environment Protection (Amendment) Act 2006 (Victoria)
 Flora and Fauna Guarantee Act 1988
 Water (Governance) Act 2006 (Victoria)
 Water (Resource Management) Act 2005 (Victoria)

Western Australia 

 Environmental Protection Act 1986 (EP Act)
 Environmental Protection (Controlled Waste) Regulations 2004
 Environmental Protection (Noise) Regulations 1997
 Environmental Protection (Unauthorised Discharges) Regulations 2004
 Health Act 1911
 Rights in Water and Irrigation Act
 Biodiversity Conservation Act
 Contaminated Sites Act

New Zealand 

 Clean Air Act 1972
 Climate Change (Forestry Sector) Regulations 2008 (SR 2008/355)
 Climate Change Response Act 2002
 Conservation Act 1987
 Environment Act 1986
 Forest and Rural Fires Regulations 2005 (SR 2005/153) (as of 6 November 2008)
 Forests Act 1949
 Hazardous Substances and New Organisms Act 1996
 Litter Amendment Act 2006
 Marine Reserves Act 1971
 National Parks Act 1980
 New Zealand Nuclear Free Zone, Disarmament, and Arms Control Act 1987
 Ozone Layer Protection Act 1996
 Reserves Act 1977
 Resource Management Act 1991 - primary environmental legislation, outlining the government's strategy of managing the "environment, including air, water soil, biodiversity, the coastal environment, noise, subdivision, and land use planning in general"
 Resource Management Amendment Act 2005
 Scenery Preservation Act 1903
 Soil Conservation and Rivers Control Act 1941
 Waste Minimisation Act 2008 - No 89 Public Act
 Wildlife Act 1953

References

External links 
 ECOLEX (Gateway to Environmental Law)
 Lexadin global law database

 
Laws
Environmental